The 1974 SANFL Grand Final was an Australian rules football competition.  defeated  by 15 points.

References 

SANFL Grand Finals
SANFL Grand Final, 1974